The Burkhan Khaldun (Cyrillic: Бурхан Халдун) is one of the Khentii Mountains in the Khentii Province of northeastern  Mongolia. The mountain or its locality is believed to be the birthplace of Genghis Khan as well as his tomb. It is also the birthplace of one of his most successful generals, Subutai.

The mountain is part of the  Khan Khentii Strictly Protected Area established in 1992. It had strong religious significance before Genghis Khan made it a powerful landmark and is considered the most sacred mountain in Mongolia since it was designated as sacred by Genghis Khan. It was inscribed as a UNESCO World Heritage Site on 4 July 2015 under the title "Great Burkhan Khaldun Mountain and its surrounding sacred landscape." Under a Presidential Decree of 1995 the worship of this mountain has been formalised and the mountain declared a national monument. Its ecosystem is complex with unique biodiversity with flora of the Central Asian steppe. It has 50 species of fauna and 253 species of birds.

Location
Burkhan Khaldun is in the northeast of Mongolia in the middle of the Khentii mountain range.

Geography
Burkhan Khaldun means the "God Mountain" and is also called Khentii Khan (The King of the Khentii Mountain range). It is one of the Khentii Mountains in the Khentii Province of northeastern  Mongolia. It is the source of several rivers: the Onon and Kherlen rivers flow into the Amur, which has its outfall in the Pacific Ocean; and the rivers Tuul, Kharaa and Yeruu flow northwards to join the Selenge, which empties into the Arctic Ocean. It is in a complex ecosystem with unique biodiversity which is defined as a "transition zone from Siberian permafrost land forms to great steppe".

History
Genghis Khan (also known as Chinggis Khan) lost his battle against the Merkit (one of the major tribal confederations (khanlig) of the Mongols) and escaped death by seeking protection in the sacred precincts of the Burkhan Khaldun mountains. An old woman saved him and a few others. As mark of great reverence, which in Mongolia is considered a highly sacred mountain of spiritual significance, and to the sun above, he offered his respects to the spirits of the mountain around him, sprayed milk into the air and sprinkled it on the earth. He removed his girdle strap, unwinding it from his outfit, and then put it around his neck. Symbolically by this act he surrendered his Mongolian man's pride and expressed his submission to the gods.

He took off his hat, crossed his hand across his chest and knelt in obeisance nine times offering worship to the sun and the mountain. He spent three days on the mountain offering prayers and thus established a strong bond of spirituality with the mountain and derived special strength from it. In the Secret History of the Mongols,  Genghis Khan, who later became the "World Conqueror" believing in his own destiny, said: 

Genghis Khan then started his campaign to unify the land and people of Mongolia as a strong force. He gave the Burkhan Khaldun the status of a royal sacred mountain. The history is chronicled in the Secret History of the Mongols, which UNESCO recognised in 1990 as a "literary creation of outstanding universal significance". In this document Burkhan Khaldun is described in detail and mentioned 27 times, which signifies the unique position of the mountain in Mongolia‘s heritage. This document establishes the authenticity of the site, stating: 

A Presidential Decree of 1955 formalised the worship of the Burkhan Khaldun Mountain as a national monument. Special worship is offered to the mountain according to a prescribed procedure at the main "Ovoo of the Heaven"; it is reserved for a few officials of the state and local administration, shamans and a few Buddhist lamas (monks).

World Heritage status

Religious significance

Burkhan Khaldun has a spiritual significance unmatched by any other mountain in Mongolia and is given the symbolic status of the “cradle” of Mongolia's nationhood fully representing the "heritage and traditional ways of life of nomadic people of Mongolia". The (unconfirmed) Mongolian belief that Genghis Khan was born here and is buried somewhere in this mountain has added to its sanctity, particularly since Khan offered worship here and declared the mountain as the most sacred in the country.

It has given authenticity to the spiritual nature of the mountain. As a result, regular pilgrimage is undertaken by the people to the three sacred major ovoos or stone cairns at the sacred sites along a specified route where Mongolian shamanic worship is offered. The specified route is unique and covers: Main Ovoo of Heaven at the pinnacle of the mountain via Gurvan Khoriud ("Three Forbidden Precincts"); the Uud Mod ("Two Trees of Entrance"); the Bosgo Tengeriin Davaa ("Threshold Pass of Heaven"); the catchment of the Kherlen River and the Sacred Bogd Rivers; and finally to the Beliin ("Lowest") ovoo.

Flora
The flora found in the mountain belongs to the Central Asian steppe and consists of coniferous forests of the taiga. The plant species reported are 28 listed in the Mongolian Red Book, 15 very rare species, and 28 species listed as rare species. The species listed in the IUCN Red List are found here: two critically endangered species, four endangered species, and eight vulnerable species.

Fauna
In the faunal geographical province of the Burkhan Khaldun Mountain in the Khentii district the fauna reported are more than "50 species of 27 genera of six orders including five species of mammals/insectivores, 4 species of hymenoptera,  four species of lagomorpha, 19 species of rodents, 13 species of predators, five species of ungulate, one species of reptile, and 253 species of birds". According to the Mongolian Red Data Book the very rare mammal species are musk deer (Moshus moshiferus) and moose (Alces alces); the very rare bird species are the Siberian white crane (Grus luecogeranus), Greater spotted eagle (Aquila clanga), Pallas’s fish eagle (Haliaeetus leucoryphus), white-naped crane (Grus vipio) and hooded crane (Grus monacha); the fish species is the Amur sturgeon (Acipenser schrenckii).

See also
 Ikh Khorig

References

Bibliography

External links
 Doncroner.com
 Unesco.org

Mountains of Mongolia
Khentii Province
World Heritage Sites in Mongolia
Two-thousanders of Mongolia